Vestnik Teatra (Theatre Courier) was the journal of the Theatre Department of Narkompros, founded in Moscow in 1919. It became an influential journal amongst theatrical practitioners during the period following the Bolshevik seizure of power. It published articles by such people as Platon Kerzhentsev and Vsevolod Meyerhold. The magazine ceased publication in 1921.

Some articles
No. 1 (1919):
'Mozhno li iskazhat' p'esy postanovkoi?' (p. 2), Platon Kerzhentsev
No. 19 (1919):
'Rozn' iskusstva' (p. 2), Platon Kerzhentsev
No. 36 (1919):
'Peredelyvaite p'esy! (pp. 6–8), Platon Kerzhentsev
No. 48 (1920):
'Teatral'nyi muzei' (pp. 4–5), Platon Kerzhentsev
No. 51 (1920):
'Burzhuaznoe nasledie' (pp. 2–3), Platon Kerzhentsev
No. 53 (1920):
'Pis'mo v redaktsiiu' (p. 5), Platon Kerzhentsev

See also
Proletcult Theatre

References

1919 establishments in Russia
1921 disestablishments in Russia
Defunct magazines published in Russia
Magazines established in 1919
Magazines disestablished in 1921
Magazines published in Moscow
Russian-language magazines
Magazines published in the Soviet Union
Theatre magazines